"Rik" is a song by Swedish rapper Albin Johnsén and Swedish singer Mattias Andréasson. The song was released in Sweden as a digital download on 28 February 2016, and was written by Johnsén and Andréasson. It took part in Melodifestivalen 2016 and qualified to andra chansen from the first semi-finale. In the semi-finale, it was eliminated.

Track listing

Charts

Release history

References

2015 songs
2016 singles
Capitol Records singles
Swedish hip hop songs
Swedish pop songs
Swedish-language songs
Melodifestivalen songs of 2016
Songs written by Mattias Andréasson